Olavina Aasare is a 1988 Indian Kannada-language film directed and produced by K. V. Jayaram. The film stars Vishnuvardhan, Rupini and Sudha Chandran. The music was composed by M. Ranga Rao and the dialogues and lyrics were written by Kunigal Vasanth and Doddarangegowda.

The film is based on a novel with the same title, written by Tanuja.

Cast
 Vishnuvardhan as Jayanth
 Rupini as Rajni
 Sudha Chandran
 Aparna
 Loknath
 Sudheer
 Lohithaswa
 Mysore Lokesh
 Dingri Nagaraj
 Anuradha

Soundtrack
All songs were composed by M. Ranga Rao for the lyrics of Doddarangegowda. The soundtrack was successful upon release.

 "Kanasali Manasali" - S. P. Balasubrahmanyam, Vani Jairam
 "Ramananthe Nema"  - S. P. Balasubrahmanyam
 "Sahasa Simha Endigu" - S. P. Balasubrahmanyam
 "Swapna Soudha" - Vani Jairam
 "Baa Raja Baa" - Vani Jairam
 "Sahasa Simhanu Bandanu" - Vani Jairam

References

External links 
 

1988 films
1980s Kannada-language films
Indian romance films
Films scored by M. Ranga Rao
Films based on Indian novels
1980s romance films